Marwan Salah (born 1 January 2004) is an Egyptian professional footballer who plays as a goalkeeper.

Club career
Salah joined the academy of Al Ahly at the age of eight, but after the club decided to merge some of their youth teams together, he was released along with four other goalkeepers. He moved to fellow Egyptian club Smouha following his release, before coming across an announcement by German club Bayern Munich in March 2021, stating that they would be signing fifteen players for their "World Squad" initiative - a squad to represent the Bavarian club in international friendlies.

He sent in some highlight videos, and was selected the following year as one of the twenty final players from total of over 2500. Having featured in a number of friendlies with the side, he was injured before the final game against the Bayern Munich youth team.

Following his experience with Bayern Munich, Salah stated that he had received offers from a number of German sides, and did not want to return to Smouha in Egypt. He was strongly linked with a move to Italian side Catania in September 2022, being pictured in a club shirt with club officials, but this move was never confirmed.

International career
Salah has been called up to Egypt's youth international training camps.

References

2004 births
Living people
Al-Azhar University alumni
Egyptian footballers
Egypt youth international footballers
Association football goalkeepers
Al Ahly SC players
Smouha SC players